Malcolm Patrick McMahon, OP, KC*HS (born 14 June 1949) is an English prelate of the Roman Catholic Church. Since 2014, he has been the ninth Archbishop of Liverpool. Previously, he was Bishop of Nottingham from 2000 to 2014.

Early life and ministry
Malcolm McMahon was born in London, the second of three brothers and studied mechanical engineering at the University of Manchester Institute of Science and Technology before working for London Transport. In 1976, he decided upon an ecclesiastical career and joined the Dominican Order. Making his religious profession in December 1977, McMahon studied philosophy at Blackfriars, Oxford and theology at Heythrop College. He was ordained to the priesthood by Cardinal Basil Hume on 26 June 1982.

He served as chaplain of Leicester Polytechnic for the 1986/7 academic year, whence he served in a London parish. McMahon later became Parish Priest of St Dominic's in Newcastle upon Tyne (1989), and of St Dominic's in Haverstock Hill (1990). He was elected prior provincial of the Dominicans' English Province in both 1992 and 1996. In 2000, he was elected prior of Blackfriars, Oxford.

Episcopal career

Bishop of Nottingham
On 7 November 2000, McMahon was appointed Bishop of Nottingham by Pope John Paul II. He received his episcopal consecration on the following 8 December from Bishop James Joseph McGuinness, with Bishops Victor Guazzelli and Patrick O'Donoghue serving as co-consecrators, in the Cathedral Church of St. Barnabas.

McMahon's name had been mentioned as a possible successor to Cormac Murphy-O'Connor as Archbishop of Westminster and to Kevin McDonald as Archbishop of Southwark. He serves as Chair of the Department of Education and Formation of the Catholic Bishops' Conference of England and Wales, Chair of the Catholic Education Service, Chair of the Board of Trustees of the Catholic Trust of England & Wales, Ecclesiastical Advisor to the Knights of Saint Columba, and President of the British Section of Pax Christi, the international Catholic peace movement.

Archbishop of Liverpool
On 21 March 2014 Pope Francis appointed Bishop McMahon as the ninth Archbishop of the Metropolitan See of Liverpool. Archbishop McMahon was enthroned at Liverpool Metropolitan Cathedral of Christ the King on 1 May 2014, the Feast of Saint Joseph the Worker, before a congregation of three thousand.

During his tenure in Liverpool, in 2017 and 2018, Archbishop McMahon ordained priests for the Priestly Fraternity of Saint Peter in St Mary's Church, Warrington, utilising the pre-1970 rite of ordination.

Views 
Archbishop McMahon has said that there is no doctrinal reason preventing priests from having wives: 

He considers clerical celibacy as a "spiritual necessity". In a pastoral letter read in the Diocese of Nottingham on Sunday 25 October 2009, then Bishop McMahon said:

He also supports the role of women in Catholic Church, but is against the ordination of women as priests:

In the same pastoral letter, Bishop McMahon said:

In April 2010, Bishop McMahon appeared on the BBC's Hard Talk to discuss the Church's response to the sexual abuse of children. He defended the work of the Holy See and the Church in England and Wales on this and expressed the hope that the Vatican would become more open and transparent in its treatment of victims and perpetrators.

Personal info
In his free time, the Archbishop enjoys playing golf and listening to live music and opera but also admits to being a fan of Norah Jones.

Portrait
On 21 March 2017, Hardman Portrait published a portrait of Archbishop McMahon to be displayed to the public in the Liverpool Metropolitan Cathedral Crypt. Archbishop McMahon is depicted in choir dress, mirroring the black and white portrait of his predecessor Archbishop Richard Downey. The portrait is one of a series of works depicting current members of Liverpool society alongside their predecessors.

References

External links

 
Archdiocese of Liverpool
Diocese of Nottingham

 -->

1949 births
Living people
Alumni of Blackfriars, Oxford
Alumni of Heythrop College
Alumni of the University of Manchester Institute of Science and Technology
Roman Catholic archbishops of Liverpool
Dominican bishops
Roman Catholic clergy from London
English Dominicans
English mechanical engineers
Roman Catholic bishops of Nottingham
People associated with De Montfort University
21st-century Roman Catholic archbishops in the United Kingdom
British Roman Catholic archbishops
English Roman Catholic archbishops